Basconcillos del Tozo is a municipality and town located in the province of Burgos, Castile and León, Spain. According to the 2004 census (INE), the municipality has a population of 371 inhabitants.

The municipality of Basconcillos del Tozo is made up of twelve towns: Basconcillos del Tozo (seat or capital), Arcellares, Barrio Panizares, Fuente úrbel, Hoyos del Tozo, La Piedra, La Rad, Prádanos del Tozo, San Mamés de Abar, Santa Cruz del Tozo, Talamillo del Tozo and Trasahedo.

See also
Páramos (comarca)
Valle del Rudrón

References 

Municipalities in the Province of Burgos